This is an overview of artists linked to Polyvinyl Record Co.

31Knots
Aloha
Alvvays
American Football
AM/FM
Antarctigo Vespucci
Architecture in Helsinki
Asobi Seksu
Ativin
Audible
Beach Slang
Birthmark
Braid
Anna Burch
Casiokids
Collections of Colonies of Bees
Corm
Decibully
Deerhoof
The Dodos
Dusted
FAN
Faux Hoax
Friction
Generationals
The Get Up Kids
Grapetooth
Hail Social
Hazel English
Headlights
Ida
The Ivory Coast
Jacco Gardner
Julia Jacklin
Jay Som
Japandroids
James Husband
Jeff Rosenstock
Joan of Arc
Kaia Fischer
Katy Goodman & Greta Morgan
Kerosene 454
La Sera
Ladyhawke
The Like Young
Loney Dear
Love Is All
The M's
Mates of State
Matt Pond PA
Mister Heavenly
of Montreal
The One Up Downstairs
Owen
Owls
Painted Palms
Paris, Texas
Cale Parks
Palehound
Pedro the Lion
Pet Symmetry
Pele
Phantastic Ferniture
Picastro
Pillar Point
Post Animal
Psychic Twin
Quiet Slang
Radiation City
Radio Flyer
Rainer Maria
The Red Hot Valentines
The Rentals
Jeff Rosenstock
Saturday Looks Good To Me
Shy Boys
Someone Still Loves You Boris Yeltsin
Sonny & The Sunsets
Stagnant Pools
STRFKR
Sunday's Best
Tancred
Their/They're/There
Fred Thomas
Shugo Tokumaru
Tu Fawning
Vivian Girls
Volcano, I'm Still Excited!!
Wampire
White Reaper
xbxrx
Xiu Xiu
ZZZZ

External links 
 Full roster of Polyvinyl artists

Polyvinyl Record Co.